Fakipole Seiloni Iaruel (born 17 April 1995) is a Vanuatuan footballer who plays as a goalkeeper for Amicale in the Port Vila Football League and the Vanuatu national football team. He made his debut for the national team on June 3, 2012 in their 5–0 victory against Samoa.

Club career
In 2011, Iaruel joined Port Vila Football League club Tafea. After having been scouted by Stoke City, he was invited to their academy for a month long trial in August 2012. In 2016, he decided to join Amicale for the 2016 OFC Champions League.

International career
Iaruel played for Vanuatu U15, Vanuatu U17, Vanuatu U20, Vanuatu U23 and since June 2012 he plays for Vanuatu.

National team
Vanuatu U-23
Four Nation’s Friendship Cup: First place

Individual
Four Nation’s Friendship Cup Golden Glove

References

1995 births
Living people
Vanuatuan footballers
Tafea F.C. players
Vanuatu international footballers
People from Port Vila
Association football goalkeepers
Footballers at the 2010 Summer Youth Olympics
2012 OFC Nations Cup players
2016 OFC Nations Cup players
Vanuatu youth international footballers
Beach soccer players
Vanuatu under-20 international footballers